The 1955 Wake Forest Demon Deacons football team was an American football team that represented Wake Forest University during the 1955 college football season. In their fifth season under head coach Tom Rogers, the Demon Deacons compiled a 5–4–1 record and finished in fourth place in the Atlantic Coast Conference with a 3–3–1 record against conference opponents.

Tackle Bob Bartholomew was selected by both the Associated Press and the United Press International as a first-team player on the 1955 All-Atlantic Coast Conference football team.

Schedule

Team leaders

References

Wake Forest
Wake Forest Demon Deacons football seasons
Wake Forest Demon Deacons football